Myriodontium keratinophilum is a fungus widespread in nature, most abundantly found in keratin-rich environments such as feathers, nails and hair. Despite its ability to colonize keratinous surfaces of human body, the species has been known to be non-pathogenic in man and is phylogentically distant to other human pathogenic species, such as  anthropophilic dermatophytes (e.g., Trichophyton rubrum, Trichophyton interdigitale). However, its occasional isolation from clinical specimens along with its keratinolytic properties suggest the possibility it may contribute to disease.

History and taxonomy
Myriodontium keratinophilum was first isolated in Italy in 1978, during the screening of soil microbes for their ability to produce antibiotic and antiviral substances. The fungus was described by Luciano Polonelli and Robert A. Samson, and was classified into a separate taxon for its ability to produce multiple asexual spores (conidia) at different points across the surface of the hypha. Later in 1997, its asexual state (teleomorph) was independently described and named as Neoarachnotheca keratinophilia by Josef Cano and Krzysztof Ulfig. M. keratinophilum is the only member of the genus Myriodontium.

Growth and morphology
The vegetative and fertile hyphae are branched, hyaline, septate, smooth-walled, and ranges from 2.5 µm to 6 µm in width. The sexual fruiting structure (gymnothecium) consists of loosely interwoven hyphae that are hyaline to yellow in colour, and typically matures within a month, attaining a diameter of 150-700 µm. The gymnothecium encloses millions of round, hyaline asci that each bear 8 ascospores. The defining feature of M. keratinophilum is that its ascospores are randomly wrinkled and pitted with an irregular sheath. The (conidia) are one-celled and emerge at multiple different points across the surface of fertile hyphae. Species of the genera Chromelosporium and Pulchromyces morphologically resemble Myriodontium.

Physiology
Myriodontium keratinophilum exhibits keratinolytic properties, and it is able to grow on and degrade keratinous surfaces such as feathers. Similar growth rate is exhibited on oatmeal agar.

Habitat and ecology
Myriodontium keratinophilum is commonly found in soils and river sediments. M. keratinophilum has been isolated from many different keratinous materials, such as the penis of a bull, hair of shrews and cats, and feathers of pigeons. The fungus also inhabits human hairs as an ectothrix that do not penetrate the cortex.

Isolation from human clinical specimens
Due to its uncertain pathogenic potential, M. keratinophilum is classified as safe to be handled with Biosafety Level 1-equivalent containment. However, in 1985, a case of frontal sinusitis from a Nigerian patient reports its isolation from the mucosal tissue lining of the sinus. Considering the elevation in the levels of plasma cells and eosiophils, M. keratinophilum was determined to be the causal agent and the patient was treated with ketoconazole. The morpholocial features of the species isolated were described to be similar to those that cause allergic aspergillosis of paranasal sinuses, such as Aspergillus flavus and Aspergillus niger. However, it has been proposed that this case may have been misdiagnosed in confusion with Schizophyllum commune. M. keratinophilum is also regularly isolated from dermatophytic and psoriatic lesions infected by non-dermatophytes, and is identified as one of the agents of hyalohyphomycosis. A report of spectrum analysis of patients with fungal infection also documents its isolation from nails of patients.

Isolation from other clinical materials
M. keratinophilum is identified to be entomopatheogenic and causes mycosis and mortality in oak lace bug (Corythucha arcuata) when exposed to conidia. Its isolates have also been found on mole cricket nymphs (Gryllotalpa gryllotalpa), and conidial application of M. keratinophilum induced significant mortality and mycosis.

References
 

Fungi described in 1978
Onygenales